Nurcan Çarkçı Göksel is a Turkish female boxer. Since the end of 2006, she is member of the sports club Kıraç Municipality in Istanbul, Turkey.
 
She was a gold medalist in the light middleweight (70 kg) division at the 2nd European Women's Boxing Championship held in Pécs, Hungary between 11 and 17 May 2003. The next year, she won a silver medal at the 3rd European Women's Boxing Championship held in Riccione, Italy between 3 and 10 October 2004.  She won a bronze medal at the 3rd World Women's Boxing Championship held between 25 September and 2 October 2005 in Podolsk, Russia. At the 5th AIBA Women's World Boxing Championship held between 22 and 29 November 2008 in Ningbo City, China, Nurcan Çarkçı became a bronze medalist in her division (70 kg).

References

External links
 Nurcan Çarkçı Göksel at Awakening Fighters

Living people
Turkish women boxers
Middleweight boxers
Year of birth missing (living people)
European champions for Turkey
21st-century Turkish sportswomen
20th-century Turkish sportswomen